The 1950 Navy Midshipmen football team represented the United States Naval Academy during the 1950 college football season. In their first season under head coach Eddie Erdelatz, the Midshipmen compiled a 3–6 record and were outscored by their opponents by a combined score of 176 to 122.

Schedule

References

Navy
Navy Midshipmen football seasons
Navy Midshipmen football